Bigbury Manor (also Bikeberye, Bydeborough, or Bidborowe) is a small manor house on the Isle of Wight within the Newchurch parish. It is a small holding to the north of Apse Heath, was confirmed to Quarr Abbey by Isabel de Fortibus, and remained in the possession of the abbey until the Dissolution of the monasteries, when it passed to the Crown. It was granted in 1610 to Lionel Cranfield, (who surrendered it the following year). In 1631 Basil Nicoll and others obtained a grant of the messuage or grange of Bidborowe.

References
This article includes text incorporated from William Page's "A History of the County of Hampshire: Volume 5 (1912)", a publication now in the public domain

Country houses on the Isle of Wight
Manor houses in England